Karta za budućnost is the eighth studio album of Montenegrin singer Šako Polumenta, which was released in June 2006.

Track listing 
"Dočekajmo jutro zajedno"
"Nije muški, ali moram"
"Karta za budućnost"
"Kida me"
"Ja nemam s'kim"
"Zamka"
"Za oproštaj ne molim"
"Posle kraja kraj"
"Ako vara me"
"Ne može on da te ima"
"Poslije tebe...?"

2006 albums
Šako Polumenta albums